Solar Valley is an industrial area in the Thalheim part of the municipality of Bitterfeld-Wolfen in the district Anhalt-Bitterfeld, Saxony-Anhalt, Germany. It is situated close to the Bundesautobahn 9 and the Leipzig/Halle Airport.

Companies
There are production and storage facilities of different companies dealing in photovoltaics situated along the main road called "Sonnenallee". 

All these companies are subsidiaries of, or suppliers to Hanwha Q Cells, which has its main engineering offices in Thalheim.

Main companies include:
CSG Solar
Hanwha Q Cells
Meyer Burger
Sontor
Solibro
Sovello

See also 
 German Silicon Valley

Industrial parks in Germany
Solar power in Germany
Manufacturing in Germany